"Innerbloom" is a song by Australian alternative dance group Rüfüs. The song was released on 20 November 2015 as the third single from the group's second studio album, Bloom (2016). The song peaked at number 65 on the ARIA Singles Chart. The song was certified platinum in Australia in 2017. The song listed at #5 in Triple J’s Hottest 100 of the Decade in March 2020, whilst the What So Not remix polled at #64.

RÜFÜS vocalist Tyrone Lindqvist said "I'm sure I'm not the first person to say this, but our favourite artists are our favourite because we've shared moments listening to them with friends or family that you can't recreate, moments you remember forever. We really wanted to create those moments for other people with the songs from Bloom. "Innerbloom" is probably the most personal song we've written in terms of where we are at as people."

Reception
Sosefina Fuamoli from the AU Review labelled the song "a surefire hit", saying the song conjures a "blissful electronic atmosphere".

In a review of Bloom, Marcus Teague from the Guardian called the song the album's "high-water mark", writing that it's "a near-ten minute swim through woozy synths unspooling towards a perfectly weighted anthem of the interior."

At the 2017 Electronic Music Awards, the "Sasha remix" won "Record of the Year".

Legacy
"Innerbloom" has had "a long-lasting impact on Australia's music culture" and is "indisputably" known as Rüfüs Du Sol's "magnum opus".

Music video
The music video was directed by Katzki and released on 26 October 2016. AAA Backstage called the video "mesmerising" saying "The "Innerbloom" video is composed entirely of artistic footage of different coloured paints being swirled together in soothing patterns. Resembling dreamy distant landscapes and far away galaxies, the visual effects paired with Innerbloom's sonic soundscape is uplifting, inspiring, and kind of therapeutic."

Track listing

Charts

Certifications

Release history

References

2015 songs
2015 singles
Rüfüs Du Sol songs